Grevena Aerata Football Club is a Greek football club, based in Grevena, Grevena (regional unit), Greece.

Honours

Domestic Titles and honours

Grevena FCA champion: 4
 2008-09, 2010–11, 2013–14, 2017-18
 Grevena FCA Cup Winners: 2
 2013-14, 2018–19

References

Football clubs in Western Macedonia
Grevena (regional unit)
Association football clubs established in 2000
2000 establishments in Greece
Gamma Ethniki clubs